Jaakko Suolahti (18 January 1918 – 28 January 1987) was a Finnish classical scholar and historian Suolahti was one of the leading classicists during his time and reached international recognition within the areas of political- and social culture in the Roman Republic.

Life 
Suolahti was born in Brändö on Åland (Autonomous region within Finland) in 1918 into a esteemed finish academic family. His father was Gunnar Suolahti, a finnish historian of great national esteem. His father became a professor in Nordic History at the University of Helsingfors the same year as Jakko was born and would keep the tenure until his death in 1933. His father was the frontrunner for the Leipzig school of historical theory based on Karl Lamprecht in Finland. His uncle, Hugo Suolahti, was principal and later chancellor of the University of Helsingfors and a cousin, Eino Suolahti would become one of Finlands most prolific essayists and historical writers.

Suolahti worked from 1947 to 1956 in the National Archives of Finland while he worked on his disputation in History which was finished in 1955 at the University of Helsingfors. He was appointed Professor of History in 1960 and would remain as such until his retirement in 1981. During the period 1962 to 1965 he was the director of the Institutum Romanum Finlandiae (located in Villa Lante al Gianicolo in Rome), the Finnish Institute in Rome.

Bibliography 

 Suolahti, Jaakko, On the Persian sources used by the Byzantine historian Agathias., Societas, Helsinki, 1947
 Suolahti, Jaakko, The junior officers of the Roman army in the Republican period: a study on social structure, Diss. Helsingfors : Univ.,Helsinki, 1955
 Suolahti, Jaakko, The Roman censors: a study on social structure, Helsinki, 1963

References 

Historians of antiquity
Textual scholarship
Historians of ancient Rome
20th-century Finnish historians
University of Helsinki alumni
People from Åland
1918 births
1987 deaths
Academic staff of the University of Helsinki